Rencher is a surname. Notable people with the surname include:

Abraham Rencher (1798–1883), American politician
Derek Rencher (1932–2014), British ballet dancer
Terrence Rencher (born 1973), American basketball player

English-language surnames